Euphorbium can also be a synonym of the genus Euphorbia.

Euphorbium, an acrid dull-yellow or brown resin, consisting of the concreted milky juice of several species of Euphorbia, cactus-like perennial plants indigenous to Morocco. It dissolves in alcohol, ether and turpentine; in water it is only slightly soluble. It consists of two or more resins and a substance euphorbone, C20H36O or C15H24O. Pliny the Elder states that the name of the drug was given to it in honor of Euphorbus, the physician of Juba II, king of Mauretania. In former times euphorbium was valued in medicine for its drastic, purgative and emetic properties.

According to Robert Bentley's (botanist) book of Organic Medical Materials from 1887

The latex of Euphorbia resinifera contains Resiniferatoxin, an ultra potent capsaicin analog.  Desensitization to resiniferatoxin is tested  in clinical trials to treat neuropathic pain.

References

Euphorbia